Stanley Roger Spencer (born August 7, 1969) is a former major league pitcher for the San Diego Padres.

Spencer was drafted by the Boston Red Sox in 1987 in the 26th round, 681st overall, and then again by the Montreal Expos with the 35th pick in the first round of the 1990 draft. After several years in the minors he made his major league debut on August 27, 1998.  He played a total of 3 seasons going 3-9 with an earned run average of 5.54 and 107 strikeouts.

Graduate of Columbia River High School, Vancouver, Washington (1987).

External links

1968 births
Living people
Stanford Cardinal baseball players
San Diego Padres players
Baseball players from Washington (state)
Major League Baseball pitchers
Sportspeople from Vancouver, Washington
Harrisburg Senators players
High Desert Mavericks players
Brevard County Manatees players
Portland Sea Dogs players
Charlotte Knights players
Rancho Cucamonga Quakes players
Las Vegas Stars (baseball) players
Portland Beavers players
Las Vegas 51s players
All-American college baseball players